Djab Wurrung (Djabwurrung, Tjapwurrung, Chaap Wuurong) is the extinct Aboriginal Australian language of the Djab Wurrung people of central Victoria.

References

Kulin languages
Extinct languages of Victoria (Australia)
Languages extinct in the 2010s
2016 disestablishments in Australia